Lakhon nok is a genre of theatre originating from the Ayutthaya era. It was based on the folk performances, similar to lakhon chatri, from what is now Southern Thailand.

References

Bibliography
 Brandon, James R. (1967). Theatre in Southeast Asia. Harvard University Press

Notes

Thai dance
Thai culture

th:ละคร#ละครนอก